Nedungudi  is a village in the Arimalamrevenue block of Pudukkottai district, Tamil Nadu, India.

Demographics 

As per the 2001 census, Nedungudi had a total population of 1973 with 957 males and 1016 females. Out of the total population 1194 people were literate.

References

Villages in Pudukkottai district